TDM may refer to:
 TDM, a 2023 Indian Marathi comedy film 
 TDM (Macau), a Macanese radio and television network
 The Yamaha TDM, a motorcycle model
 Target Disk Mode, a boot mode on certain Macintosh computers
 Team deathmatch, a mode of gameplay in video games
 Technical death metal, a subgenre of heavy metal music
 , a Mozambican telecommunications and Internet service provider
 Teresian Daughters of Mary, a Filipino Roman Catholic institute
 Text data mining, a process of deriving high-quality information from text
 The Difference Machine, an album by English rock band Big Big Train
 Therapeutic drug monitoring, a branch of clinical chemistry
 Time-division multiplexing, a method of transmitting and receiving independent signals over a common signal path
 Toad Data Modeler, a database design tool
 Transportation demand management, also traffic demand management or travel demand management
 DanTDM, British YouTube personality